Stadion Lokomotiv is a multi-purpose stadium in Gorna Oryahovitsa, Bulgaria.  Predominantly used for football matches, the stadium has been the home ground of the local football club FC Lokomotiv Gorna Oryahovitsa since 1956. The venue has a seating capacity of 10,500 spectators.

2016 renovations
In 2016, following Lokomotiv GO's promotion to the top flight, the stadium underwent major renovations to meet the licensing criteria of the Bulgarian Football Union. As a result, part of the stands were rebuilt, the floodlight system of the stadium was restored and the grass surface was improved. The stadium was opened in December 2016 for Lokomotiv GO's domestic league match against CSKA Sofia, attracting an attendance of 9,000 spectators.

Records
The record attendance of the stadium is 19,500 and was achieved at a game between Lokomotiv GO and Levski Sofia.

FC Lokomotiv Gorna Oryahovitsa
Football venues in Bulgaria
Gorna Oryahovitsa
Buildings and structures in Veliko Tarnovo Province